Lakeside is a rural locality in the North Burnett Region, Queensland, Australia. In the  Lakeside had a population of 55 people.

Geography 

The Lake is a waterhole.

Lakeside railway station is an abandoned railway station on the now-closed Mungar Junction to Monto railway line.

The land use is predominantly grazing on native vegetation.

History 
Mungore Creek Provisional School opened on 16 October 1893. In 1903 it was renamed Mungore Provisional School. On 1 January 1909 it became Mungore State School. In 1911 it was renamed Lakeside State School. It closed on 25 December 1948.

In the  Lakeside had a population of 55 people.

Economy 
There are a number of homesteads in the locality:

 Ashton
 Broken Arrow Appaloosa Stud
 Gayndah Monto Branch
 Highstone
 Hopewell
 Lake Side
 Magges
 Nimrod Glen
 Nimrod Glen
 Red Hill

Education 
There are no schools in Lakeside. The nearest primary school and secondary school to Year 10 is Biggenden State School in neighbouring Biggenden to the north-west. The nearest secondary school to Year 12 is Isis District State High School in Childers to the north-east.

References 

North Burnett Region
Localities in Queensland